Sumiran Amonkar (born 28 July 1991) is an Indian cricketer. He made his first-class debut for Goa in the 2016–17 Ranji Trophy on 20 October 2016. On his debut, he scored a century. He made his List A debut for Goa in the 2016–17 Vijay Hazare Trophy on 25 February 2017.

References

External links
 

1991 births
Living people
Indian cricketers
Goa cricketers